The Vir Bahadur Singh ministry  is the Council of Ministers in 9th Uttar Pradesh Legislative Assembly headed by Chief Minister Vir Bahadur Singh.

Chief Minister & Cabinet Ministers 
 Vir Bahadur Singh - Chief Minister
 Baldev Singh Arya - Revenue
 Lokpati Tripathi - Public Health and Medical
 Swaroop kumari Bakshi - Social Welfare
 Sanjay Singh - Transport
 Narendra Singh - Agriculture
 Shyam Surat Upadhyay - Rural Development and Panchayati Raj
 Arun Kumar Singh - Cooperatives
 Sunil Shastri - Energy
 Sibte Razi - Education and Muslim Waqf

Minister of State 
 Hukum Singh - Parliamentary Affairs, Food and Logistics and Animal Husbandary
 Zafar Ali Naqvi - Forest
 Padma Seth -Urban Development

 Shiv Balak Pasi - Agriculture
 Om Prakash Richhariya - Finance and Planning
 Gauri Shankar - Revenue
 Manpal Singh - Food and Logistics
 Ram Naresh Shukla - PWD, Revenue, Law, Home Guards and Freedom Fighters

References

Vir
Indian National Congress state ministries
1985 establishments in Uttar Pradesh
Cabinets established in 1985